Dena (in Luri and ) is the name for a sub-range within the Zagros Mountains, Iran. Mount Dena, with  length and  average width, is situated on the boundary of the Isfahan, Kohgiluyeh and Boyer-Ahmad and Chaharmahal and Bakhtiari Provinces of Iran.

With an elevation of 4,409 metres above sea level, Qash-Mastan is the highest peak in the Dena Range and in the Zagros Mountains in general. Another known peak in this range is Hose-Daal close to the city of Sisakht,  to the north of Yasuj.

Geologically, Mount Dena is located in the Sanandaj-Sirjan geologic and structural zone of Iran and is mainly made of Cretaceous limestone.

On 18 February 2018, Iran Aseman Airlines Flight 3704 crashed into Mount Dena, killing all 66 people on board.

Gallery

See also 
 List of Iranian four-thousanders
 List of Ultras of West Asia

References 

Mountains of Isfahan Province
Mountains of Kohgiluyeh and Boyer-Ahmad Province
Mountains of Chaharmahal and Bakhtiari Provinces
Biosphere reserves of Iran
Mountaineering in Iran
Zagros Mountains
Landforms of Kohgiluyeh and Boyer-Ahmad Province
Landforms of Isfahan Province
Landforms of Chaharmahal and Bakhtiari Province
Tourist attractions in Kohgiluyeh and Boyer-Ahmad Province
Mountains of Iran